Gurmeet Singh (born 1 July 1985 in Uttarakhand, India) is an Indian athlete who competes in the 20 kilometres race walk event. He is a current Indian record holder in the 20 km race walk, which he set in the Indian Grand Prix I in Patiala in May 2011. Gurmeet is sponsored by the Mittal Champions Trust, an initiative run by steel magnate Lakshmi N. Mittal. He is one of the three Indian athletes who qualified for the 2012 Summer Olympics in 20 km race walk event with an 'A' qualification standard (1:22:30). He achieved this berth in the 18th Dublin International Grand Prix in Ireland after finishing sixth with a time of 1:22:05.

In the event he clocked a time of 1:23:34 and finished 33rd.

Life and career
Singh was born in a small village in Uttarakhand state. He considers his cousin Surjit Singh, who also is a discus thrower, his inspiration for choosing athletics. He won a silver in the national junior championships in 2000. He finished fifth in the 2001 Asian Junior Athletics Championships in Brunei.

His career turned around in late 2010, when he started training at Sports Authority of India, Bangalore centre under the coach Ramakrishnan Gandhi. In March 2012, he walked a time of 1:21:31 at the Asian Championships in Nomi, Japan.
He clinched a gold medal in the Asian 20 km  race walk championship finishing 1 hour 20 minutes and 29 seconds in Mar 2016. This is the first time such record in 34 years that an Indian won a gold in either an Asian championship or Asian Games event.

Personal life
Singh is married to Deepmala Devi, also a 20 km walker.

References

External links

Living people
1985 births
Athletes from Uttarakhand
Indian male racewalkers
Athletes (track and field) at the 2012 Summer Olympics
Olympic athletes of India
World Athletics Championships athletes for India
Athletes (track and field) at the 2016 Summer Olympics